The 1962 United States Senate election in North Carolina was held on November 6, 1962. Incumbent Democratic Senator Sam Ervin was re-elected to a second term in office over Republican farmer Claude Greene Jr. 

Ervin was elected to a second full (six-year) term, though by a somewhat smaller margin than he enjoyed in his victory in 1956.

Democratic primary
Ervin was unopposed for the Democratic nomination.

Republican primary

Results

General election

Results

Footnotes

1962
North C
1962 North Carolina elections